Lophiobagrus is a genus of catfish in the family Claroteidae. They are endemic to Lake Tanganyika in Africa.

Species 
There are currently four recognized species in this genus:
 Lophiobagrus aquilus R. M. Bailey & D. J. Stewart, 1984
 Lophiobagrus asperispinis R. M. Bailey & D. J. Stewart, 1984
 Lophiobagrus brevispinis R. M. Bailey & D. J. Stewart, 1984
 Lophiobagrus cyclurus (Worthington & Ricardo, 1937) – African bullhead

References 

 
Claroteidae
Catfish genera

Freshwater fish genera
Taxa named by Max Poll
Taxonomy articles created by Polbot